Barsky (masculine), Barskaya (feminine), or Barskoye (neuter) is the name of several rural localities in Russia.

Modern localities

Ivanovo Oblast
As of 2012, one rural locality in Ivanovo Oblast bears this name:
Barskoye, Ivanovo Oblast, a village in Palekhsky District

Kostroma Oblast
As of 2012, two rural localities in Kostroma Oblast bear this name:
Barskoye, Galichsky District, Kostroma Oblast, a village in Orekhovskoye Settlement of Galichsky District; 
Barskoye, Kostromskoy District, Kostroma Oblast, a village in Sushchevskoye Settlement of Kostromskoy District;

Moscow Oblast
As of 2012, one rural locality in Moscow Oblast bears this name:
Barskoye, Moscow Oblast, a village in Davydovskoye Rural Settlement of Orekhovo-Zuyevsky District

Ryazan Oblast
As of 2012, one rural locality in Ryazan Oblast bears this name:
Barskoye, Ryazan Oblast, a village in Ushmorsky Rural Okrug of Klepikovsky District

Vologda Oblast
As of 2012, three rural localities in Vologda Oblast bear this name:
Barskoye, Gryazovetsky District, Vologda Oblast, a village in Pokrovsky Selsoviet of Gryazovetsky District
Barskoye, Sokolsky District, Vologda Oblast, a village in Prigorodny Selsoviet of Sokolsky District
Barskoye, Vologodsky District, Vologda Oblast, a village in Kipelovsky Selsoviet of Vologodsky District

Yaroslavl Oblast
As of 2012, two rural localities in Yaroslavl Oblast bear this name:
Barskoye, Lyubimsky District, Yaroslavl Oblast, a village in Voskresensky Rural Okrug of Lyubimsky District
Barskoye, Yaroslavsky District, Yaroslavl Oblast, a village in Melenkovsky Rural Okrug of Yaroslavsky District

Abolished localities
Barskoye, Parfenyevsky District, Kostroma Oblast, a village in Parfenyevsky Selsoviet of Parfenyevsky District in Kostroma Oblast; abolished on October 18, 2004

Alternative names
Barsky, alternative name of Krasnoarmeysky, a settlement in Kusaksky Selsoviet of Nemetsky National District in Altai Krai;

References

Notes

Sources